PMM2 deficiency or PMM2-CDG is a very rare genetic disorder caused by mutations in PMM2. It is an autosomal recessive disorder. A defective copy of the PMM2 gene is the most common cause of a disease called “congenital disorders of glycosylation” or “PMM2-CDG”. PMM2-CDG is the most common of a growing family of more than 130 extremely rare inherited metabolic disorders. Only about 1000 children and adults have been reported worldwide.

Signs and symptoms 
Failure to thrive (FTT) - Failure to gain weight and grow at the expected rate.
Cerebellar hypoplasia - Small cerebellum, which is the part of the brain that coordinates movement.
Liver disease - Elevated liver function tests.
Pericardial effusion - Fluid around the heart.
Peripheral neuropathy (PN) - Impaired nerve impulse transmission to the legs. Patients do not respond well to reflex tests.
Strabismus - Crossed eyes, mainly presented as infantile Esotropia
Nystagmus - Involuntary eye movements caused by Cerebellar ataxia.
Hypotonia - Weak muscle tone, commonly known as floppy baby syndrome.

Diagnosis 
PMM2 deficiency is diagnosed through genetic sequencing. More than 115 mutations in PMM2 gene have been found to cause this disease.

Treatment
Treatment with mannose powder 1-2g / kg per day results in significant improvement in protein glycosylation after 1 year. Other treatments involves management of the symptoms that are apparent in each individual, including Physical Therapy to improve core strength and mobility, Occupational Therapy for coordination, Speech Therapy for talking and eating.

References

Genetic diseases and disorders
Congenital disorders of glycosylation